Fred Kornet Jr. (October 2, 1919 – June 22, 2018) was an American lieutenant general in the United States Army. He served as commander of the U.S. Army Aviation Systems Command.

Born and raised in the Wortendyke section of Midland Park, New Jersey, Kornet graduated from Pompton Lakes High School in 1936 and then attended Lehigh University, where he majored in chemical engineering. He enlisted in the United States Army in February 1941.

References

1919 births
2018 deaths
Lehigh University alumni
Pompton Lakes High School alumni
United States Army generals
United States Army personnel of World War II
People from Midland Park, New Jersey